Brad Lomax (born Bradford Clyde Lomax; September 13, 1950 – August 28, 1984), also known as Bradley Lomax, was a member of the Black Panther Party and a disability rights activist who helped lead the 504 Sit-in in San Francisco.

Early life and education 
Lomax was born in Philadelphia, Pennsylvania on September 13, 1950. His mother was Katie Lee (Bell) Lomax, and his father was Joseph Randolph Lomax. He had two younger siblings.

He first became aware of racial segregation at age 13 during a visit to Alabama, where he saw signage for segregated public spaces.

While he planned to join the military in 1968 after he graduated from Benjamin Franklin High School, African American soldiers received poorer treatment in the military during the Vietnam War, and he instead attended Howard University.

Lomax was diagnosed with multiple sclerosis the same year, and began using a wheelchair. Despite having a wheelchair, he found that many public buildings lacked ramps, making them inaccessible to people with disabilities.

Activism 
After helping found the Washington chapter of the Black Panther Party in 1969, he continued to help organize the 1972 African Liberation Day demonstration on the National Mall.

Lomax was motivated to join the disability rights movement after attempting to use public transportation in Oakland, California, after moving there in 1973. Since he used a wheelchair, boarding a bus required having his brother carry him from his wheelchair to a bus seat. He served as the public relations co-coordinator for the George Jackson Clinic in 1974. In 1975, He reached out to Ed Roberts, director of the Berkeley Center for Independent Living (CIL) to propose another Center for Independent living East Oakland, in partnership with the Black Panthers. The center operated for only two years, due to limited support from both the Berkeley CIL and the Black Panther Party.

In 1977, he participated in the 504 Sit-in at the San Francisco Federal Building, and encouraged the Black Panthers to provide meals and other supplies to the protestors. The protest was in response to the failure of the Department of Health, Education and Welfare (HEW) to implement Section 504 of the Rehabilitation Act of 1973. The HEW secretary, Joseph A. Califano Jr., signed the regulations on April 28, 1977, after Lomax and approximately two dozen other protesters traveled to Washington.

Death and legacy 
Lomax died August 28, 1984, in Sacramento, California, due to complications of multiple sclerosis.

In 2020, he appeared in the American documentary Crip Camp and was featured in The New York Times' "Overlooked" obituary series in July.

References 

1950 births
1984 deaths
20th-century African-American people
American disability rights activists
American people with disabilities
People with multiple sclerosis
African-American activists
People from Philadelphia
Howard University alumni
Wheelchair users